A Million Colours, also called Colors of Heaven, is a 2011 film directed by Peter Bishai and co-written with Andre Pieterse.  It is based on the lives of Muntu Ndebele and Norman Knox, actors in the film Forever Young, Forever Free, also known as e'Lollipop.  It follows them from the success of the film around the time of the Soweto Uprising, through to the election of Nelson Mandela.

Cast
 Wandile Molebatsi as Muntu Ndebele
 Jason Hartman as Norman Knox
 Masello Motana as Sabela
 Stelio Savante as Major Shawn Dixon

Reception
One reviewer said of the film, "It is a tale of the exploration of morality, self-sacrifice, integrity and the conviction of one’s belief system. To those with an open mind it will offer a rich exploration of the past, but it is one that requires an appreciation of telling the story of the personal to take us inside the past, and bring child film star Muntu’s story to life."

References

External links
 
 
 

2011 films
English-language South African films
2011 crime drama films
South African crime drama films
Films set in South Africa
2010s English-language films